Harrodsburg is an unincorporated community and census-designated place in Clear Creek Township, Monroe County, in the U.S. state of Indiana. Its population was 691 at the 2010 census.

History
Harrodsburg was originally known as Newgene, and under the latter name was platted in 1836. The post office at Harrodsburg has been in operation since 1840.

Geography

Demographics

Harrodsburg Community Center
The Harrodsburg Community Building, built in 1992, is a central site for community events and public meetings. It also serves as a polling place for the Clear Creek 3 precinct. Funds to maintain the center are raised in part from the annual Heritage Days Festival.

Attractions and community events
Harrodsburg Heritage Days Festival is a free-admission event held annually in May.

From 1981 to 2013, the Harrodsburg Haunted House was a popular attraction in Monroe County, running weekends throughout October. Clear Creek Township Trustee Thelma Kelley Jeffries attributed the closing to increasing "government and state permits and laws" required for operation.

References

External links
 Harrodsburg in the Indiana Memory Digital Collections
 Harrodsburg Heritage Days Association
 Harrodsburg Haunted House

Census-designated places in Monroe County, Indiana
Census-designated places in Indiana
Bloomington metropolitan area, Indiana